George Williams (10 February 1881 – 13 May 1946) was an  Australian rules footballer who played with St Kilda in the Victorian Football League (VFL).

Notes

External links 

1881 births
1946 deaths
Australian rules footballers from Victoria (Australia)
St Kilda Football Club players
Williamstown Football Club players